Fazil Rashid (born 11 December 1996) is an Indian cricketer. He made his List A debut for Jammu & Kashmirin the 2017–18 Vijay Hazare Trophy on 11 February 2018. He made his first-class debut for Jammu & Kashmir in the 2018–19 Ranji Trophy on 1 November 2018. He made his Twenty20 debut on 11 November 2019, for Jammu & Kashmir in the 2019–20 Syed Mushtaq Ali Trophy.

References

External links
 

1996 births
Living people
Indian cricketers
Jammu and Kashmir cricketers
People from Srinagar